Steve French (born May 22, 1962) was a Republican member of the Alabama Senate, representing the 15th District from 1999 - 2010.
He is now an insurance executive and a partner in a specialty lending company. In 2014 he ran for the U.S. House of Representatives, he earned a place in the run-off but withdrew before the primary run-off election.

French was the 6th Congressional District Chairman for the 2004 Bush/Cheney Presidential Campaign, the Alabama Organizational Chairman for the 2000 George W. Bush Presidential Campaign, the Alabama Campaign Manager for the 1992 Bush/Quayle Presidential Campaign, the Regional Political Director for the Republican National Committee from 1991 to 1992, and the Executive Director for the Alabama Republican Party from 1988 to 1991. In 1992, he founded a political consulting company, which he operated until his election to the State Senate in 1998.

During his time in the Alabama Senate, even though he was in the minority throughout his tenure, French was recognized for his investment and insurance knowledge.  French was named to the Alabama Commission on Infrastructure, the SMART Governing Legislative Task Force, Legislative Oversight committee for State Pensions and a member of the Legislature's Permanent Joint Transportation Committee.

Among French's legislative accomplishments and initiatives are: Securing $25 million in State Funding to complete the Richard C. and Annette N. Shelby Interdisciplinary Biomedical Research Building at the University of Alabama-Birmingham; Sponsored and passed SB66 which allows the State of Alabama, and its entities, to invest in State of Israel Bonds; Sponsored ban on 'Pass-thru Pork'; Sponsored 'Fund for the Future' to aid Alabama's Research institutions and the vitally important work they perform; Sponsored and passed the General Fund Rainy Day Fund Constitutional Amendment (it also amended the Education Budget's Rainy Day Fund) that the voters subsequently ratified; Sponsored a Constitutional Amendment to repeal the 'legislative immunity' for lawmakers; Sponsored the Rolling Reserve Act that was passed by Legislative action after French's term ended.

References

External links
Alabama State Legislature - Senator Steve French official government website
Project Vote Smart - Senator Steve French (AL) profile
Follow the Money - Steve French
2006 2002 1998 campaign contributions

Republican Party Alabama state senators
1962 births
Living people
Politicians from Lynchburg, Virginia
Politicians from Birmingham, Alabama